Michelle Wright is the second studio album by the Canadian country music artist Michelle Wright. It was released on July 17, 1990, on Arista Nashville. The album's first single, "New Kind of Love", was Wright's first top 40 country hit in the U.S.

Track listing 
All song written by Steve Bogard/Rick Giles except where noted.
 "All You Really Wanna Do" - 3:16
 "New Kind of Love" - 3:54
 "Woman's Intuition" - 2:52
 "Wide Open" (Charlie Black, Bogard) - 3:43
 "Not Enough Love to Go 'Round" (Bogard, Bobby Fischer, Giles) - 3:52
 "The Longest Night" - 3:21
 "The Dust Ain't Settled Yet" (Craig Bickhardt, Brent Maher, Don Schlitz) - 3:18
 "A Heartbeat Away" - 3:18
 "Like a Hurricane" (Michael Clark) - 3:59
 "As Far as Lonely Goes" (Matraca Berg, Janis Ian) - 3:14

Personnel 
As listed in liner notes.
 Richard "Spadey" Brannon - bass guitar
 Paul Franklin - steel guitar 
 John Gardner - drums
 Paul Hollowell - keyboards
 Carl Marsh - Fairlight
 Brent Mason - guitars
 Terry McMillan - percussion

All background vocals by Rick Giles except "Like a Hurricane" - Rick Giles and Nancy T. Michaels.

References 

Arista Records albums
Michelle Wright albums
1990 albums
Canadian Country Music Association Album of the Year albums